Hans-Erich-Nossack-Preis is a former literary prize of Germany, later Literaturpreis des Kulturkreises der deutschen Wirtschaft.

Winners

 1989 Friederike Mayröcker
 1991 Helga M. Novak
 1992 Günter Herburger
 1993 Rolf Haufs
 1994 Edgar Hilsenrath
 1995 Anna Maria Jokl
 1996 Heinz Czechowski
 1997 Rafik Schami 
 1998 Volker Braun
 1999 Wolfgang Hilbig
 2000 Peter Kurzeck
 2001 Jörg Steiner
 2002 Paul Wühr
 2003 Adolf Endler
 2004 Dieter Forte
 2005 Walter Kempowski
 2006 Ernst-Wilhelm Händler
 2007 Elke Erb

References

German literary awards